Nelson J. Chu (September 16, 1976 – August 14, 2016), known professionally as DJ Official, was an American Christian hip hop DJ. He was a member of the Christian hip hop collectives 116 Clique and The Cross Movement.

Early life
DJ Official was born Nelson J. Chu, in The Bronx, on September 16, 1976. He lived in Brooklyn during his childhood and later in Amityville, Long Island.

Personal life
DJ Official was married to Teresa Chu (née Belvisi), and together they had two daughters, Isabella and Sophia. They resided together in Lancaster, OH. He had a long-term battle with several health problems, On August 14, 2016, Chu died of complications following a double lung transplant.

Music career
DJ Official was a mentee of Hip hop artist Cipha Sounds in the mid-1990s, when both got out of high school. He was a member in the Christian hip hop collective 116 Clique. He released Entermission on December 29, 2009. It allowed him to crack the Billboard charts with his first album. Cross Rhythms rated the album a nine out of ten, and Rapzilla said "With Entermission DJ Official did much more than cement his legacy as a producer."

DJ Official was also a part of American-based Christian Hip Hop rap group The Cross Movement and collaborated with many other Cross Movement Records artist such as, Da TRUTH and Flame to name a few. He served (Cross Movement) faithfully as their DJ for eight years in the mid 1990s into early 2000s and has been a long time friend thereafter.

Discography

Studio albums

Extended plays

References

1976 births
2016 deaths
American rappers
American performers of Christian music
Performers of Christian hip hop music
Rappers from New York (state)
Rappers from Philadelphia
Rappers from the Bronx
Reach Records artists